Nordstromia vira is a moth in the family Drepanidae. It was described by Frederic Moore in 1866. It is found in Myanmar, India (Sikkim, Darjeeling, Assam), Nepal and China (Sichuan, Fujian, Tibet).

The wingspan is about 27 mm. Adults are pale fawn colour, the hindwings pale yellow anteriorly. There are two oblique dark brown lines crossing both wings, between which are three small white discal spots. There is a pale submarginal line and the exterior border of both wings is defined by a brown line.

References

Moths described in 1866
Drepaninae